Bolquère is a commune in the Pyrénées-Orientales department in southern France.

Geography

Localization 
Bolquère is located in the canton of Les Pyrénées catalanes and in the arrondissement of Prades.

Transportation 
Bolquère-Eyne station is the highest railway station on the SNCF network at an elevation of 1593m [the highest SNCF station is the Gare du Lac at 1914m on the stand-alone Train de L' Artouste line]. It serves the Yellow Train exclusively.

Government and politics 
Mayors

Population

See also
Communes of the Pyrénées-Orientales department

References

External links 

  City council website

Communes of Pyrénées-Orientales